The 2010 Tulane Green Wave football team represented Tulane University in the 2010 college football season. The Green Wave, led by fourth-year head coach Bob Toledo, are members of Conference USA in the West Division and played their home games at the Louisiana Superdome. They finished the season 4–8, 2–6 in C-USA play.

Schedule

Roster

References

Tulane
Tulane Green Wave football seasons
Tulane Green Wave football